The Square (formerly known as Rosemary Square and CityPlace) is an upscale lifestyle center in downtown West Palm Beach, Florida, along South Rosemary Avenue. Considered a New Urbanist mixed-use development, The Square is architecturally composed of Mediterranean and Venetian elements. The -center contains more than 60 restaurants and stores, as well as rental apartments, condos, and offices.

Opening in October 2000, the property, which constitutes several city blocks, is primarily credited for West Palm Beach's urban renaissance, which had previously been notorious for crime, poverty, and vacant and dilapidated businesses and houses.

AMC Parisian 20 and IMAX, LA Fitness and Publix are the center's anchors. The fourth anchor was Macy's which closed in 2017. Hotspots include Cheesecake Factory, Sloan's Ice Cream, and Starbucks. Apart from shopping, dining, and cinema, the center is now at the forefront of West Palm Beach's entertainment complementing establishments located on nearby Clematis Street.

The Raymond F. Kravis Center for the Performing Arts and Alexander W. Dreyfoos, Jr. School of the Arts are located within walking distance to The Square, as is the Palm Beach County Convention Center. An early-century trolleybus circles downtown between The Square and Clematis.

History

Prior to completion
By the 1980s, downtown West Palm Beach had acquired a reputation for crime, poverty, and vacant and dilapidated businesses and houses. United States senator Lawton Chiles referred to the area as a "war zone", while local politicians were not optimistic about the future of downtown. West Palm Beach had the highest crime rate for a city of its size in the late 1980s. Crack USA: County Under Siege, a 1989 documentary film about the crack epidemic, was filmed in West Palm Beach.

In 1986, private investors David C. Paladino and Henry J. Rolfs presented a 20-year, $433 million project to revitalize the western side of downtown, in the vicinity of where The Square is presently located. Paladino and Rolfs purchased and razed properties across  of land – more than 300 properties – adjacent to Okeechobee Boulevard for about $40 million, with the exception of the historic First United Methodist Church (built in 1926), which later became the Harriet Himmel Theater. The duo donated  of land for development of the Kravis Center for the Performing Arts, which opened in 1992.

However, by the early 1990s, the project was discontinued after Rolfs exhausted his personal fortune and due to defaulted loans, foreclosures, lawsuits, and a recession. Then-Mayor of West Palm Beach Nancy Graham and the city acquired the land in 1995 using a multimillion-dollar loan and eminent domain. On August 1, 1996, three proposals for developing the former Uptown/Downtown project area were presented to the city of West Palm Beach – CityPlace, KravisPlace, and Millennium. Each proposal called for keeping the historical church and constructing hundreds of thousands of square feet for stores, hundreds or tens of thousands of square feet for a movie theater, tens of thousands of square feet for restaurants, hundreds of thousands of square feet for office space, and thousands of hotel rooms and apartment units. The teams planning the proposals were scheduled to present further details in early October. However, on September 30, the team bidding for Millennium withdrew.

The city commission made their final decision regarding future use of the site of the formerly proposed Downtown/Uptown project in October 1996. Commissioners voted 5-1 to approve the $375 million project called CityPlace, proposed by Himmel & Co., the Related Cos., the O'Connor Group, and the Related Group. Their plan included an 18 to 24 screen movie theater and a number of restaurants, upscale stores, apartments, and office buildings. In return, the city agreed to invest $75 million for construction of streets, parking garages, and plazas, with $20 million already borrowed for purchasing land.

Construction began on May 1, 1998, during a gala featuring speakers including the project leaders, Mayor Nancy Graham, and Congressmen Mark Foley and Clay Shaw. Initial rates for tenants ranged from $40-$45 per square foot, a smaller amount than at malls and places such as Worth Avenue, but higher than rates for space on nearby Clematis Street. The project was expected to be completed by November 1999, though CityPlace would actually open in October 2000.

Since completion
CityPlace opened to the public on October 27, 2000, with 31 stores and 1 restaurant opening during the first weekend. Many other stores and restaurants were expected to open by mid-December, bringing the total number of stores and restaurants to about 70. The original anchors for CityPlace were Barnes & Noble, Macy's, Muvico Parisian 20 and IMAX theater. Wild Oats Markets was also planned as an original anchor. However, financial problems halted construction in 2000. CityPlace filed suit to terminate their lease, with both parties settling a few weeks later. On August 20, 2001, Wild Oats Markets was replaced by Publix as an anchor, which opened in January 2002.

Early on, CityPlace sought to attract many high-end stores as tenants, though emphasis shifted to home furnishings during the housing bubble. By the Great Recession, the focus turned heavily toward dining and entertainment establishments becoming tenants.

In January 2017, Macy's closed 68 of their stores across the United States, including its location at CityPlace. The former Macy's building is temporarily housing Downton Abbey: The Exhibition. Related Companies submitted plans for and gained approval from the city commission in November 2018 for transforming the building into a 21-story apartment building, which would add 300-400 new residential units to CityPlace.

As part of a re-imaging effort, CityPlace was renamed "Rosemary Square" in April 2019. Related Companies intends to invest almost $550 million for the construction of new restaurants, a new mixed-use luxury residential tower, and a new hotel, as well as an office tower containing  of space. Some asphalt roads were replaced with gray and white pavers and converted into pedestrian walking areas.

In 2021, Rosemary Square was renamed once again, this time dropping the word "Rosemary" to become "The Square." Its website and branding was updated accordingly.

Concept
The shopping center is the epitome of a New Urbanist mixed-use development. Most of its architecture is West European-inspired, with mainly Mediterranean and Venetian elements. However the CityPlace Tower constructed in 2007, and associated with the original property, is postmodern. This tower has been downtown West Palm Beach's first office development in over twenty years. Later phases of CityPlace, including Montecito Palm Beach (formerly called The Mark at CityPlace) and CityPlace South Tower, retain loyalty to the original development's architecture. Excluding these more recent additions, The Square proper contains 600 private residences.

The Harriet Himmel Theater, a former Methodist church, is located at the center of The Square. Built in 1926 in the Spanish Colonial Revival style, it has undergone a six million dollar restoration, and serves today as a cultural center. Surrounding squares, arcades, and promenades feature  water fountains and lush landscaping.

Anchors

AMC Parisian 20 and IMAX; 
Publix; 
LA Fitness
Restoration Hardware

Former anchors
FAO Schwarz (closed in 2004, became Panera Bread and Taverna Opa; 
Barnes & Noble Booksellers (now closed, became LA Fitness)
Muvico Parisian 20 and IMAX (converted to AMC Theatres in 2017)
Macy's (demolished 2019)

Gallery

References

External links
The Square official website
CityPlace Tower official website
CityPlace South Tower official website
The Square real estate website
Realtor CityPlace West Palm Beach
CityPlace West Palm Beach

Shopping malls in Palm Beach County, Florida
Shopping malls established in 2000
Pedestrian malls in the United States
Buildings and structures in West Palm Beach, Florida
2000 establishments in Florida